This list is for fictional cyborgs.

Literature
John A. B. C. Smith from Edgar Allan Poe's story "The Man That Was Used Up" (1839).
Baron Savitch from Edward Page Mitchell's story "The Ablest Man in the World" (1879).
The Tin Woodman from L. Frank Baum's Oz books (at least before he became entirely metal).
Number 241 from the 1917 play Blod and Iron, by Robert Hobart Davis and Perley Poore Sheehan.
Doctor Q from the 1919 novelization of the serial The Master Mystery, by Arthur B. Reeve.
The Clockwork man from a novel of same name written by E.V. Odle in 1923.
Gabriel, real name Benedict Masson, from Gaston Leroux's novel La machine à assassiner (1924).
 The Ardathian from Francis Flagg's story "The Machine Man of Ardathia" (1927).
 Hanley and the comet-people from Edmond Hamilton's story  "The Comet Doom" (1928).
The Mi-go aliens from  H. P. Lovecraft's novella The Whisperer in Darkness (1931).
Professor Jameson and the Zoromes from Neil R. Jones's story "The Jameson Satellite" (1931).
Nyctalope, real name Léo Saint-Clair, in the Jean de La Hire's novel L'Assassinat du Nyctalope (1933).
 Simon Wright, from Captain Future stories (1940-1946), written by Edmond Hamilton.
Deirdre from C. L. Moore's short story "No Woman Born" (1944).
Habermans and Scanners from Cordwainer Smith's  story "Scanners Live in Vain" (1950).
The Immobs from Bernard Wolfe's novel Limbo (1952).
Dr. Julius No from a novel of same name written by Ian Fleming in 1958.
Helva and the shell people from Anne McCaffrey's story "The Ship Who Sang" (1961).
The Cyborgs from Frank Herbert's novel The Eyes of Heisenberg (1966).
Jim from Damon Knight's story "Masks" (1968).
Howard Falcon from Arthur C. Clarke's novella A Meeting with Medusa (1971).
Harry Benson from Michael Crichton's novel The Terminal Man (1972).
Steve Austin from Martin Caidin's novel Cyborg (1972).
 P. Burke (Philadelphia Burke) from James Tiptree Jr.'s novella "The Girl Who Was Plugged In" (1973).
The Sauron Supermen from the novel The Mote in God's Eye, written by Larry Niven and Jerry Pournelle in 1974.
Roger Torraway from Frederik Pohl's novel Man Plus (1976).
Jonas from Gene Wolfe's novel series Book of the New Sun (1980–1983).
Molly Millions from William Gibson's Sprawl trilogy (1984-1988).
The Comprise, a computer-mediated hive mind which has taken over Earth, in the novel Vacuum Flowers (1987) by Michael Swanwick.
Linda Nagy, a.k.a. Ellen Troy, from the novel series Venus Prime (1987-1991), written by Arthur C. Clarke and Paul Preuss.
Shrike from Dan Simmons's novel series Hyperion Cantos (1989-1997).
 Jessamyn Bonney from Kim Newman's novel Demon Download (1990).
 Xris Cyborg from Margaret Weis's Star of the Guardians series (1990-1998). 
Angus Thermopyle from Stephen R. Donaldson's The Gap Cycle (1991-1996).
Yod from Marge Piercy's novel He, She and It (1991).
Rat Things from Neal Stephenson's Snow Crash (1992). 
In William C. Dietz's Legion of the Damned (1993) the Legion is made up of a combination of humans and heavily armed cyborgs (human brains in mecha forms).
Buck Rogers in the Martin Caidin's novel Buck Rogers: A Life in the Future (1995).
Jagernauts from Catherine Asaro's Saga of the Skolian Empire (1995-). 
Hannes Suessi from David Brin's Uplift novels is transformed into a cyborg by the time he re-appears in Infinity's Shore (1996).
 Mendoza from Kage Baker's novel In the Garden of Iden (1997).
 Takeshi Kovacs from Richard Morgan's Altered Carbon (2002).
 Linh Cinder from Marissa Meyer's The Lunar Chronicles (2012-2015).
 The Murderbot from Martha Wells's The Murderbot Diaries (2017-).

Comics and manga

1940s
Robotman from DC Comics (1942)

1950s
Metallo from DC Comics (1959)

1960s
8 Man (1963)
The Brain  from DC Comics (1964)
Cyborgs 001, 002, 003, 004, 005, 006, 007, 008, and 009 from Cyborg 009 (1964)
Robotman from Doom Patrol  comic book series (1963)

1970s
Deathlok from Marvel Comics (1974)
Rom and other Spaceknights from Marvel Comics (1979)
Beilert Valance from Marvel Comics (1978)

1980s
Cyborg from Teen Titans comic book series (1980)
Tetsuo Shima from Akira (1982)
Fugitoid from Teenage Mutant Ninja Turtles series (1984)
Briareos Hecatonchires from Appleseed series (1985)
Lady Deathstrike from Alpha Flight series (1986)
Nuke from Daredevil series (1986)
Android 17, Android 18, Dr. Gero/Android 20, and Cell from Dragon Ball Z (1989)
Coldblood from Marvel Comics Presents (1989)
Motoko Kusanagi from Ghost in the Shell (1989)
Rudol von Stroheim from Battle Tendency (1988)

1990s
Baxter Stockman from Teenage Mutant Ninja Turtles series
Cable from X-Men series (1990)
Heatwave from Cyberforce (1992)
Cy-Gor from Spawn series (1993)
 The Dark Legion introduced in Archie Comics' Knuckles the Echidna comic series and featured in Sonic the Hedgehog and Sonic Universe, and its Dark Egg Legion expansion.
Omega Red from X-Men series (1992)
Overtkill from Spawn series (1993)
Alita from the Gunnm/Gunnm:Last Order series (1990–present)
Toadborg from Bucky O'Hare and the Toad Wars series
Alexander Anderson from Hellsing (1997–present)
Verminator X from Teenage Mutant Ninja Turtles Adventures series

2000s
Edward Elric from Fullmetal Alchemist
Franky from One Piece series (2004)
Jack Marlin from Tales of the Teenage Mutant Ninja Turtles
Jorgen von Strangle and Sparky from The Fairly OddParents! (2001)
Lucia von Bardas from Secret War
Donald Ferguson from Brit (comics) and Invincible (comics)
The Major, Heinkel Wolfe from Hellsing
Bartholomew Kuma from One Piece
 Tony Stark from Iron Man, after the Extremis procedure.
 Kimiko Ross from webcomic Dresden Codak.

2010s
 The Egg Army featured in Archie Comics' Sonic the Hedgehog properties, replacing the Dark Legion and Dark Egg Legion following a continuity reboot.
 Genos from One-Punch Man.
 Katie Cooper - Cyborg Studies
 Sy Borgman from Harley Quinn

Movies (including television movies)

Before 1950
 Doctor Q from serial The Master Mystery (1918)
 C. A. Rotwang from Fritz Lang's Metropolis (1927)
 John Ellman from The Walking Dead (1936)

1950s
W. H. Donovan from Donovan's Brain (1953)
Dr. Knupp from The Robot vs. The Aztec Mummy (1958)
Jerry Spensser from The Colossus of New York (1958)

1960s
Jan Compton from The Brain That Wouldn't Die film (1962)
Dr. Julius No from James Bond film Dr. No (1962)
Garth and the two Tracers from the future, from the film Cyborg 2087 (1966)

1970s
Gigan from the Godzilla franchise
Steve Austin from Six Million Dollar Man TV movie (1973) and TV series (1973 to 1978)
The Gunslinger from Westworld (1973)
Katsura Mafune from the film Terror of Mechagodzilla (1975)
Anakin Skywalker/Darth Vader from the Star Wars series (1977)
 The lobotomized crew from The Black Hole (1979)

1980s
Luke Skywalker from the Star Wars series (1980)
Vera Webster from Superman III (1983)
Overdog from Spacehunter: Adventures in the Forbidden Zone (1983)
Tommy from Exterminators of the Year 3000 (1984)
T-800 from the film The Terminator (1984)
Mandroid from Eliminators (1986)
 Paco Queruak from Vendetta dal futuro (1986)
Samantha Pringle / BB from Deadly Friend (1986)
Mr Igoe from Innerspace (1987)
RoboCop from the RoboCop series
Briareos Hecatonchires from Appleseed (1988)
Pearl Prophet from Cyborg (1989)
Griff Tannen (Biff Tannen's grandson) and his gang from Back to the Future Part II (1989)

1990s
Circuitry Man from Circuitry Man film (1990)
Phillip from Cyborg Cop film (1993)
RoboCop 2 and Cain from the RoboCop series
Austin from American Cyborg: Steel Warrior
Borg Queen from Star Trek: First Contact (and series Star Trek: Voyager)
Casella "Cash" Reese from Cyborg 2 and Cyborg 3
Cyborg Mark in Hong Kong Stephen Chow's comedy Sixty Million Dollar Man
Elgar in Turbo: A Power Rangers Movie
John Brown/Inspector Gadget from Inspector Gadget film (1999)
Sanford Scolex/Dr. Claw from Inspector Gadget film (1999)
*Lt. Parker Barnes from the film Virtuosity (1995)
T-800 and the T-1000 from the film Terminator 2: Judgment Day (1991)
Casshan in Casshan: Robot Hunter(1993–94)
Mecha-King Ghidorah From the Godzilla Series
Luc Deveraux / GR44 (Universal Soldier, 1992)
Motoko Kusanagi from Ghost in the Shell (1995 film) (1995)
Batou from Ghost in the Shell (1995 film) (1995)
Dr. Arlis Loveless from Wild Wild West (1999)
Various units from Universal Soldier

2000s
Del Spooner from I, Robot (2004)
Frankenstein from Van Helsing (2004)
John Silver from Treasure Planet (2002)
Jason Voorhees from Jason X (2002)
Kiryu, an iteration of Mechagodzilla from Godzilla Against Mechagodzilla and Godzilla: Tokyo S.O.S. (2002-2003)
Doctor Octopus from Spider-Man 2 (2004)
Briareos Hecatonchires from Appleseed (2004)
General Grievous from Star Wars: Episode III – Revenge of the Sith (2005)
Anakin Skywalker/Darth Vader from the Star Wars series (2002)
T-850 and the T-X from Terminator 3: Rise of the Machines (2003)
Briareos Hecatonchires from Appleseed: Ex Machina (2007)
Marcus Wright from Terminator Salvation (2009)
Isaac from Cyborg Soldier (2008)
Roboduff from Kim Possible: A Sitch in Time
Tima from Metropolis (2001 film) (2001)

2010s
Frankenstein from Death Race 2050
Ramona Flowers from Scott Pilgrim
Platyborg, an alternate version of Perry the Platypus from Phineas and Ferb the Movie: Across the 2nd Dimension, and cyborg versions of other animal secret agents introduced in a later episode of the series.
A.R.C.1 from Cybornetics (2012)
Max Da Costa from Elysium (2013)
Metalbeard, a robotic pirate and a Master Builder in The Lego Movie (2014)
Ava from The Machine (2013)
Alex Murphy from RoboCop (2014)
Briareos Hecatonchires, from Appleseed XIII (2011-2012), Appleseed: Alpha (2014)
James Buchanan "Bucky" Barnes (Winter Soldier), from Captain America: The Winter Soldier (2014) 
Charles "Charlie" Hesketh, from Kingsman: The Golden Circle (2017)
Anakin Skywalker/Darth Vader from the Star Wars series (2016)
Victor Stone from Justice League (2017)
Grace from Terminator: Dark Fate (2019)
Killian from Spies in Disguise (2019)
April from the Sharknado_(film_series)
Thor from the Marvel Cinematic Universe. Got a cybernetic eye in Avengers: Infinity War (2018)

2020's
 Mechagodzilla in Godzilla vs. Kong (2021)

Television series

1960s
Daleks from the Doctor Who series (1963)
Cybermen from the Doctor Who series (1966)
Batfink from Batfink (1966)

1970s
Steve Austin from The Six Million Dollar Man (1974)
Jaime Sommers from The Bionic Woman (1976)
Dynomutt, Dog Wonder from Scooby-Doo & Dynomutt Hour (1976)
Count Blocken from Mazinger Z (1972)
Casshan from Casshan (1973)
Takeshi Hongo/Kamen Rider #1 and Hayato Ichimonji/Kamen Rider #2 from Kamen Rider (1971)

1980s
The Borg from the Star Trek series
Doc Terror from The Centurions
Inspector Gadget from Inspector Gadget series (1983)
Krang from Teenage Mutant Ninja Turtles
Hacker from The Centurions 
Trap-Jaw from Masters of the Universe
Sgt. Eve Edison from "Mann & Machine"
Jiban from Kidou Keiji Jiban
Quintessons from Transformers
Man-E-Faces from He-Man
X-Ray from Rambo: The Force of Freedom
The SilverHawks from SilverHawks series (1986)
Shinya Takeda from Dennou Keisatsu Cybercop (TV series 1988-1989)]
Thirty/Thirty the cyborg equine from Bravestarr (TV series, 1987)

1990s
Astronema from Power Rangers in Space
Dr. Gero from Dragon Ball Z
Android 17 and 18 from Dragon Ball Z
Gadget Boy from Gadget Boy & Heather
Haxx from Extreme Dinosaurs
Taurus Bulba from Darkwing Duck (1991)
Mr. Freeze from The New Batman Adventures
Richard Nixon from Futurama (1999)
Dr. Robotnik from the Sonic the Hedgehog cartoon, its associated comic series, and Sonic Underground.
Bunnie Rabbot from the Sonic the Hedgehog cartoon and comic series.
Seven of Nine from Star Trek: Voyager
Jet Black from Cowboy Bebop
The various Evangelion units from Neon Genesis Evangelion have the appearance of humanoid mechas but are actually cyborgs.
Toadborg from Bucky O'Hare and the Toad Wars
Mukuro from YuYu Hakusho is a demon with robotic parts.
Steerminator from Darkwing Duck 
Targetman from Doug
Various unis in Swat Kats

2000s
Adam from Buffy the Vampire Slayer (2000)
Alan Gabriel from The Big O (2002)
Avery Bullock from American Dad!
Bob Oblong from The Oblongs (2001)
Bizarro Debbie and Bizarro Marco from Sealab 2021 (2002)
Brother Blood from Teen Titans (2005)
Cash from Ben 10: Alien Force
Chief Wiggum' from The Simpsons episode "Future-Drama"
The Cyborganizer from The Simpsons
Cyberface from Saturday Night Live
Daleks from Doctor Who series (2005–present)
Dillon, Tenaya 7, and others from Power Rangers RPM (2009)
Eddie and Lou from The Simpsons episode "Future-Drama"
Gemini from Kim Possible
Macker, the Safecracker from Totally Spies! (2001)
Mechanikat from Krypto the Superdog (2005)
Irkens (because of the PAK fused to their spines) from Invader Zim (2001)
Agent Z from Buzz Lightyear of Star Command (2000)
Emperor Zurg from Buzz Lightyear of Star Command (2000)
Tecna of Zenith from Winx Club is half-android in some versions.
Baxter Stockman from Teenage Mutant Ninja Turtles (2003)
Curt Connors from The Spectacular Spider-Man (2008)
General Grievous from Star Wars: Clone Wars (2003)
Hannibal McFist from Randy Cunningham: 9th Grade Ninja
Henrietta, Triela, Rico, Claes, Angelica, Elsa de Sica, and Elizaveta from Gunslinger Girl
Heloise from Jimmy Two-Shoes
Jeremiah Gottwald from Code Geass
The Jokerz from Justice League Unlimited
Jonas Venture Junior from The Venture Bros.
Kraab from Ben 10
Master Billy Quizboy from The Venture Bros.
Max Tennyson from Ben 10
Bannakaffalatta from Doctor Who
Max Capricorn from Doctor Who
Morticon from Power Rangers Mystic Force
Motoko Kusanagi from Ghost in the Shell: Stand Alone Complex (2002)
Jaime Sommers from the 2007 re-imagining of Bionic Woman.
Cameron Phillips and the T-888 in Terminator: The Sarah Connor Chronicles.
Blackarachnia from the Transformers: Animated TV series
Manny Armstrong from Ben 10: Alien Force
Gatling from World of Quest (2008–present)
Grooor from Ōban Star-Racers
RoboCable from RoboCop: Prime Directives
Pickles from Futurama
Sebastian Saga from Totally Spies!
 Skulker and Nicolai Technus from Danny Phantom
S.O.P.H.I.E, Power Rangers S.P.D.
Stan Smith from American Dad!
Mad March, an undead cyborg assassin from Alice the miniseries.
The Rat King Teenage Mutant Ninja Turtles.
Dr. X from Action Man
Cyborg Alpha (Kaitou), Beta (Harry), Gamma (Ray), Delta (Hizuru Asuka) and Epsilon (Shun Kazami) from Towa no Quon.
Kiera Cameron from Continuum (2012–present)
WinoBot from Wonder Showzen

2010s
Adam Davenport from Lab Rats
Lieutenant Commander Airiam from Star Trek: Discovery
Badgerclops from Mao Mao: Heroes of Pure Heart
Baron Von Steamer from Big Hero 6: The Series
Barry Dylan from Archer
Belly Bag and Tiny Miracle from Uncle Grandpa
Ben and Gwen Tennyson from Ben 10 episode Ben Again and Again (2018) 
Commander Forge Ferrus from Max Steel (2013-2016)
Conway Stern from Archer
Bob from Lab Rats: Bionic Island
Bree Davenport from Lab Rats
Black Heron from DuckTales
Blitz Borgs from NFL Rush Zone: Guardians Unleashed
Carol and Red Action from OK K.O.! Let's Be Heroes
Chase Davenport from Lab Rats
Colonel Leland Bishop/Silas/C.I.L.A.S. from Transformers Prime, a human connected to a deceased Decepticon body.
Cybear from Ben 10
The Cybergs from Teenage Mutant Ninja Turtles
Cyborg Raccoon from Robot Chicken
Daniel from Lab Rats: Bionic Island
 Darrell and Shannon from OK K.O.! Let's Be Heroes
Darth Maul from Star Wars: The Clone Wars, who is shown to have survived his apparent demise at the end of Star Wars: Episode I – The Phantom Menace and is shown with multiple sets of mechanical legs.
Delaney Pilar from Pandora
Della Duck from DuckTales (2017 TV series)
Dutch from Archer
 Ernesto from OK K.O.! Let's Be Heroes
Evil Cyborg Julian from Randy Cunningham: 9th Grade Ninja
Dr. Blowhole from The Penguins of Madagascar (2010) (Has only a cyborg-type right eye)
Finn the Human, Jake and BMO from Adventure TimeFuture Barbara Gordon from DC Super Hero GirlsFuture Perry the Platypus from Phineas and FerbFuture Barry Allenfrom DC Super Hero GirlsGary Goodspeed from Final SpaceGeneral Rubbish from Major LazerGwen Tennyson from Ben 10 (2016 TV series) episode Ben Again and Again (2018) 
Hannibal McFist from Randy Cunningham: 9th Grade NinjaIron Baron from  Masters of SpinjitzuThe Iron Terror from Speed Racer: The Next GenerationLiborg from Axe CopJames Ironwood from RWBYJethro from OK K.O.! Let's Be HeroesKate from Lab Rats: Bionic IslandKatya Kazanova from ArcherKraven the Hunter from Spider-ManLeo Dooley from Lab RatsLord Boxman, Professor Venomous and Fink from OK K.O.! Let's Be HeroesMaahox' from Voltron ForceMercury Black from RWBYMajor Lazer from Major LazerManchine from Kroll ShowThe Mechanic from NinjagoMegahertz from Mighty MedMikayla from OK K.O.! Let's Be HeroesMoe Szyslak from The Simpsons episode Mr. Lisa's OpusMr. Fischoeder from Bob's Burgers episode Sliding BobsPickles from FuturamaPhoenixperson from Rick and MortyProfessor Paradox from Ben 10: OmniverseRay Gillette from ArcherRaymond from OK K.O.! Let's Be Heroes'''Rick Sanchez from Rick and MortyRobo Dino from SuperMansionRobo-Stache from Bob's BurgersS-1 from Lab RatsScar Man from Teen Titans Go!Sebastian from Lab RatsSevika from Arcane (TV series)Shiro from Voltron: Legendary DefenderSpin from Lab RatsTiger Claw from Teenage Mutant Ninja Turtles (2012 TV series)Techmo from Regular ShowTiffany from Adventure TimeWells 2.0 from The FlashWallow from Bravest WarriorsYang Xiao Long from RWBYVandata from The Venture Bros.Verminator Rex from Teenage Mutant Ninja Turtles (2012 TV series)Victor Krane from Lab RatsViolet Evergarden from Violet EvergardenVrak from Power Rangers MegaforceBriareos Hecatonchires from Appleseed XIIIGenos from One Punch ManRobot from Lost in Space (2018)

Video gamesAdam Jensen, Anna Navarre, Gunther Herrman, Jaron Namir, Lawrence Barrett, Yelena Fedorova, and several other characters in Deus Ex and its prequel, Deus Ex: Human Revolution, are augmented with cybernetics.Amber Torrelson, one of the four player characters in Project Eden, is a cyborg Urban Protection Agent; her body has been rebuilt within a giant robotic frame after sustaining fatal injuries in a train accident.Barret from Final Fantasy VIIBerle, Ruprecht, Shigeo, and Vesper of the Ten Wise Men from Star Ocean: The Second Story.Biological Engineering Project 154, the protagonist of the Thing Thing series.Brad Fang from Contra: Hard CorpsBryan Fury from the Tekken seriesCap'n Hands and F.U.B. from LoadedCaptain Tobias Bruckner from Turok: EvolutionCATS, the Main antagonist from the game Zero Wing
The Combine from Half-Life 2 base the core of their fighting forces on synths, cyborgs made from members of various previously enslaved species. Whenever they subjugate a world, the dominant species of the planet is turned into cyborgs, giving the Combine an army that can be deployed in any kind of planetary environment; the most prominent ones seen are Dropships, Gunships, Striders and Hunters. With Earth as their newest acquisition, an unknown number of humans (mainly dissidents and Civil Protection volunteers) have been cybernetically enhanced into Overwatch Soldiers. Dissidents unsuitable for conversion are instead turned into Stalkers, heavily dismembered torsos with crude metallic limb replacements. Overwatch Elites are implied to have received more augmentations than ordinary Soldiers and various content cut from the game's final version includes even more radical designs such as humans fused into bulky, biomechanical powered armor.Commander Shepard, the protagonist of Mass Effect, is extensively implanted with cybernetics in an effort to bring him/her (Shepard's gender is chosen by the player; as such, there is no canon gender) back from the dead.
Experimental Cyber Soldier Program, or Direct Neural Interface, which may cause the death of the test subjects, from Call of Duty: Black Ops III.Cyberdemon, a boss in the Doom game franchiseCyborg, Cyborg Reaper and Cyborg Commando, cyborg soldiers developed by Brotherhood of Nod in Command and Conquer 2 and its expansion pack Firestorm, who later went rogue with the renegade Nod AI CABAL (Computer Assisted Biologically Augmented Lifeform) to fulfill its world domination. All of these cyborgs are superior to their human counterparts, and the strongest of them, the Cyborg Commando, can even defeat a Mammoth Mk.2 superheavy walker in a one-on-one showdown.Cyborg infantry from Command and Conquer 3: Kane's Wrath, utilized by Nod subfaction Marked of Kane, which, led by CABAL's reincarnation LEGION, bears a striking resemblance to CABAL's army in the previous war. The Awakened serve as Marked of Kane's basic infantry, Tiberium troopers as close range anti-infantry/anti-structure support, and Enlightened as elite anti-ground troopers.Doctor N. Gin from the Crash Bandicoot seriesDeadeye Joe from Contra Hard CorpsDr. Crygor from the WarioWare, Inc. seriesDr. Raoul from Master X MasterECO 35-2 from Rise of the Robots
The Electrocutioner from BatmanFulgore from the Killer Instinct seriesGar'Skuther, the villain of Spore Creatures
Genji, an advanced cyborg ninja who appears as a playable character in Overwatch and Heroes of the Storm.Gray Fox & Raiden from the Metal Gear Solid series
The Grox are a race of cyborg carnivores creatures, that rule most of the Galaxy in Spore, and the main antagonists.Hung Lo, Lo Wang's evil brother from Shadow Warrior: Twin DragonIji, the titular character from the indie game Iji.Jake, from Night SlashersCyrax, Sektor, Smoke, and Cyber Sub-Zero from the Mortal Kombat seriesLopers from Return to Castle Wolfenstein
The Marathon Trilogy's protagonistMartha, and M. Blaster from The Combatribes
The Masked Man from Mother 3Matthew Kane from Quake 4Maxima, a character from The King of Fighters series.Nathan Spencer From the Bionic Commando seriesNecrons, a race from the Warhammer 40,000 universe, are led by what seem to be intelligent machine organisms. The Obliterators of the Chaos faction fuse their weapons and armor directly into their flesh.Plant Contra from Neo ContraR.A.X. Coswell, a kickboxing cyborg from Eternal Champions and Eternal Champions: Challenge from the Dark SideRevenant from Apex LegendsRex, a cybordog from Fallout: New VegasSergeant Rex "Power" Colt, the protagonist from Far Cry 3: Blood Dragon
Cyber Shredder from Teenage Mutant Ninja Turtles III: Radical RescueSpartans from the Halo series receive extensive physical augmentations, including ceramic plated bones in order to resist the stresses of using their MJOLNIR powered armor that can lethally injure unaugmented humans with a wrong move.Starkiller from The Star Wars Series.
The Strogg from the Quake series are a warlike cybernetic race. The Strogg systematically replace their ranks with prisoners of war, "stroggified" and assimilated through the modification of their bodies with mechanical weaponry and prosthetics. The games Quake II (1997) and Quake 4 (2005) feature Strogg cyborg enemies in many shapes and variations.Steve Hermann from ShatterhandSuper Soldiers from Return to Castle WolfensteinSymbionts from Supreme Commander
Many of the enemies, along with the protagonist from System Shock and its sequel, System Shock 2.Yoshimitsu from the Tekken and Soulcalibur series.
 Vanessa Z. Schneider' from P.N.03'', who wears  cybernetic suits that connect to her spine and central nervous system to enable her to shoot blasts of energy from her body and palms.

See also
List of fictional robots and androids
List of fictional gynoids
Science fiction

References

 Fictional cyborgs
Cyborgs
Science fiction themes